George Dawson (10 May 1961 – 7 May 2007) Was a Democratic Unionist Party (DUP) politician. 

Dawson was a Member of the Northern Ireland Assembly (MLA) for East Antrim from November 2003 until his death in 2007, following a short battle with cancer. He was seen as a potential member of the power-sharing executive of the first minister, the DUP leader Ian Paisley, whose evangelical Protestant and strong unionist beliefs he shared.

Dawson was a founder in 1998, and was until his death the chairman, of the Caleb Foundation, a Christian fundamentalist pressure group. He was also Grand Master of the Independent Orange Order and Treasurer of the Evangelical Protestant Society.

References

External links
 georgedawson.org (archived)

1961 births
2007 deaths
People from Lurgan
Alumni of Queen's University Belfast
Democratic Unionist Party MLAs
Northern Ireland MLAs 2003–2007
Northern Ireland MLAs 2007–2011
Deaths from cancer in Northern Ireland
People educated at Banbridge Academy
Presbyterians from Northern Ireland
Christian creationists
Christian fundamentalists